Aileen Christina Frisch (born 25 August 1992) is a  South Korean-Slovenian luger. Frisch competed at the 2018 Winter Olympics and 2022 Winter Olympics for South Korea.

Sports career
In 2012, Frisch became the world junior female singles luge champion, competing as a German.

Frisch failed to make the German luge team for the 2014 Winter Olympics.

She retired from luging in 2015 at age 22. After her retirement, she was contacted by German coaches hired by South Korea to become a naturalized South Korean and join the South Korean luge team. At first, she refused, but in 2016, she consented and acceded to a second request when she started missing the competitions. In December 2016, she became a South Korean citizen so she could legally compete on the South Korea team at the 2018 Winter Olympics. She also competed at the 2022 Winter Olympics.

See also
South Korea at the 2018 Winter Olympics

References

External links

 
 
 

1992 births
Living people
South Korean female lugers
Lugers at the 2018 Winter Olympics
Lugers at the 2022 Winter Olympics
Olympic lugers of South Korea
Naturalized citizens of South Korea
South Korean people of German descent
German female lugers
German emigrants to South Korea
People from Lebach
Sportspeople from Saarland